Maison Planeix is a villa located in the 13th arrondissement of Paris, France. It was designed by Le Corbusier and Pierre Jeanneret for the sculptor Antonin Planeix. It was completed in 1928. In 1976 it was listed as a monument historique.

References

Le Corbusier buildings in France
Buildings and structures in the 13th arrondissement of Paris
Houses in Paris
Monuments historiques of Paris